"Cat's in the Bag..." is the second episode of the first season of the American television drama series Breaking Bad. Written by Vince Gilligan and directed by Adam Bernstein, it aired on AMC in the United States and Canada on January 27, 2008.

Plot 
Walt and Jesse return the RV to Jesse's house, which was previously owned by Jesse's late aunt. When they open the RV to remove the two bodies inside, they notice that Krazy-8 is still breathing, despite inhaling the toxic phosphine gas. The unconscious Krazy-8 is taken into the basement and secured to a pole with a bicycle lock around his neck. Walt suggests that they should use hydrofluoric acid to dissolve Emilio's corpse so that it leaves no evidence behind. Walt and Jesse must dispose of the corpse and kill Krazy-8, and toss a coin to see who will do which task. Jesse wins and chooses to dispose of the corpse, leaving Walt to kill Krazy-8.

Walt instructs Jesse to buy a bin made from polyethylene in which the corpse can be properly dissolved, but Jesse cannot find a bin big enough to accommodate it. Walt thinks about suffocating Krazy-8 but is unable to go through with the act. He instead gives Krazy-8 food, water, and toilet paper out of guilt. When Jesse returns home and asks if Krazy-8 is dead, Walt promises to take care of him the next day. Meanwhile, Skyler begins to suspect that Walt is hiding something due to his recent strange behavior. After Jesse makes a call to Walt's home phone, Skyler traces his phone number online and discovers his social media website. When she questions Walt as to who he is, he claims that Jesse sells him marijuana. Skyler finds his address and confronts Jesse while he is trying to dispose of Emilio's body, warning him that her brother-in-law is a DEA agent. Skyler doesn't notice the corpse.

Jesse does not find the specific plastic bin Walt instructed him to use, so he decides to dissolve the corpse in his upstairs bathtub. However, the hydrofluoric acid dissolves the ceramic and metal bathtub along with the body. This causes the ceiling beneath it to collapse, spilling Emilio's liquified remains onto the hallway below. Walt tells Jesse that hydrofluoric acid will dissolve anything except polyethylene. Meanwhile, two Native American children playing in the desert find Walt's gas mask from the previous meth cook.

Production 
The episode was written by Vince Gilligan, and directed by Adam Bernstein; it aired on AMC in the United States and Canada on January 27, 2008.

Title meaning 
The episode title is a part of a line from the 1957 film Sweet Smell of Success, in which a character reports that he resolved an issue:

J.J. Hunsecker: That means you've got a plan. Can you deliver?Sidney Falco: Tonight, before you go to bed. The cat's in the bag and the bag's in the river.

Critical reception 
The episode received critical acclaim. Seth Amitin of IGN gave the episode a rating of 9.6 out of 10, commenting: "It's strange, but there's a great chemistry between these three characters, like they're puzzle pieces and their jagged edges aren't even close to matching, but they fit somehow." Donna Bowman of The A.V. Club gave the episode an "A−", saying: "At the end of the powerhouse premiere last week, I thought: Well, it's all downhill from here... I found it hard to imagine that such an episode could maintain the premiere's edge-of-psychosis tone."

In 2019, The Ringer ranked "Cat's in the Bag..." 31st out of all 62 Breaking Bad episodes. Vulture.com ranked it 33rd overall.

See also

References

External links 
 "Cat's in the Bag..."  at the official Breaking Bad site
 

2008 American television episodes
Breaking Bad (season 1) episodes
Television episodes written by Vince Gilligan